These are the results (medal winners) of the swimming competition at the 1978 World Aquatics Championships held in the city of West Berlin between August 20 and August 28.

Medal table

Record(*)

Medal summary

Men

Legend: WR – World record; CR – Championship record

Women

Legend: WR – World record; CR – Championship record

References
 1978 World Aquatics Championships-results
HistoFINA Men
HistoFINA Women

1978 World Aquatics Championships
Swimming at the World Aquatics Championships
1978 in swimming